Shady Side is a census-designated place (CDP) in Anne Arundel County, Maryland, United States. The population was 5,803 at the 2010 census.

History
In the 1790s the area was known as the Great Swamp.

Among the historic structures in Shady Side is the Capt. Salem Avery House. It was listed on the National Register of Historic Places in 2005. The Lula G. Scott Community Center was listed in 2009.

Shady Side was once served by the sidewheel passenger steamer, Emma Giles, that operated from Baltimore, making up to five trips per week.

Geography
Shady Side is located at  (38.834965, −76.517326) in southern Anne Arundel County, on the western shore of Chesapeake Bay. It is bordered to the north and west by the West River, a wide tidal inlet of the bay. To the south is the CDP of Deale, and to the west, across the West River, is Galesville. The community is served by Maryland Route 468 (Shady Side Road), which runs south, then west, then north, toward the Annapolis area.

Demographics

As of the census of 2020, there were 5,806 people, 2,017 households, and 1,537 families residing in the CDP. The racial makeup of the CDP was 82.2% White, 11.3% African American, 0.47% Native American, 1.6% Asian, 0.40% from other races, and 4.1% from two or more races. Hispanic or Latino of any race were 3.3% of the population.

There were 2,064 households, out of which 37.8% had children under the age of 18 living with them, 61.1% were married couples living together, 9.1% had a female householder with no husband present, and 25.5% were non-families. 19.9% of all households were made up of individuals, and 5.9% had someone living alone who was 65 years of age or older. The average household size was 2.69 and the average family size was 3.10.

In the CDP, the population was spread out, with 15.8% under the age of 18, 5.8% from 18 to 24, 33.6% from 25 to 44, 25.2% from 45 to 64, and 8.6% who were 65 years of age or older. The median age was 37 years. For every 100 females, there were 101.7 males. For every 100 females age 18 and over, there were 99.6 males.

The median income for a household in the CDP was $68,406, and the median income for a family was $70,893. Males had a median income of $43,800 versus $36,431 for females. The per capita income for the CDP was $29,458. About 3.9% of families and 4.5% of the population were below the poverty line, including 3.1% of those under age 18 and 9.1% of those age 65 or over.

References

Census-designated places in Anne Arundel County, Maryland
Census-designated places in Maryland
Maryland populated places on the Chesapeake Bay